Mount Pleasant is an unincorporated community in Frederick County, Maryland.

References

Populated places in Frederick County, Maryland